The 2015 Nigerian Senate election in Kaduna State was held on March 28, 2015, to elect members of the Nigerian Senate to represent Kaduna State. Shehu Sani representing Kaduna Central and Suleiman Othman Hunkuyi representing Kaduna North won on the platform of All Progressives Congress, while Danjuma Laah representing Kaduna South won on the platform of Peoples Democratic Party.

Overview

Summary

Results

Kaduna Central 
All Progressives Congress candidate Shehu Sani won the election, defeating People's Democratic Party candidate Mohammed Aruwa and other party candidates.

Kaduna North 
All Progressives Congress candidate Suleiman Othman Hunkuyi won the election, defeating People's Democratic Party candidate Ahmed Makarfi and other party candidates.

Kaduna South 
Peoples Democratic Party candidate Danjuma Laah won the election, defeating All Progressives Congress candidate Ishaku Shekarau and other party candidates.

References 

Kaduna State Senate elections
Kad
Kad